Oliver Geissmann  (born 9 December 1978 in Grabs, Switzerland) is a Liechtensteiner sport shooter, specializing in the 10 metre air rifle. Geissmann has represented his country at the Summer Olympics in 2000, 2004 and 2008. Geissmann was Liechtenstein's only Olympic representative in 2004, and one of two in 2008.

References
https://web.archive.org/web/20110714153503/http://m.naplesnews.com/news/2004/Aug/26/ndn_olympics__one_is_the_lonliest_number_for_this_/
Liechtenstein National Olympic Committee Website

External links
Geissmann's profile at ISSF NEWS

1978 births
Living people
ISSF rifle shooters
Liechtenstein male sport shooters
Olympic shooters of Liechtenstein
Shooters at the 2000 Summer Olympics
Shooters at the 2004 Summer Olympics
Shooters at the 2008 Summer Olympics